Natural Bridge Wildlife Ranch is a ranch and wildlife refuge in Texas. The ranch is a Texas Land Heritage Property, certified by the State of Texas for being used for agriculture by the same family for over 100 years. It comprises over 400 acres of Texas Hill Country publicly accessible by automobile.

It is not affiliated with the Natural Bridge Caverns.

Animals
Natural Bridge Wildlife Ranch provides habitat for more than 500 animals representing more than 40 species. The owners, Ray and Trudy Soechting, obtained some animals from zoos, and others were purchased from exotic animal breeders or imported.

Some of the animals at the ranch include:

Notes

External links

Safari parks
Zoos in Texas
Tourist attractions in San Antonio
1984 establishments in Texas
Zoos established in 1984